Darrell Wesh (born 21 January 1992) is a Haitian-American athlete competing in sprinting events. Earlier he represented the United States. He is the Haitian 100m record holder at 10.16 seconds. He graduated from Landstown High School in Virginia Beach, Virginia in 2010 and Virginia Tech in 2015, earning a degree in property management. He competed in the 2016 Olympics for Haiti.

His sister Marlena is also a sprinter.

Competition record

Personal bests
Outdoor
100 metres – 10.14 (+0.9 m/s, Raleigh 2013)
200 metres – 20.70 (-0.4 m/s, Raleigh 2013)
Indoor
60 metres – 6.57 (Fayetteville 2013)

References

1992 births
Living people
Sportspeople from Virginia Beach, Virginia
Track and field athletes from Virginia
Haitian male sprinters
American male sprinters
Pan American Games competitors for Haiti
Athletes (track and field) at the 2015 Pan American Games
Athletes (track and field) at the 2016 Summer Olympics
Olympic athletes of Haiti
Competitors at the 2018 Central American and Caribbean Games
American sportspeople of Haitian descent
Virginia Tech Hokies track and field athletes